Qasemabad (also Romanized as Qāsemābād; also known as Ghasem Abad Ghareh Kahria and Qāsīmābād) is a village in Shamsabad Rural District, in the Central District of Arak County, Markazi Province, Iran. At the 2006 census, its population was 879, in 260 families.

References 

Populated places in Arak County